Warmingia is a genus of orchids belonging to the subfamily Epidendroideae within the family Orchidaceae. It has four species, native to South and Central America.

Species

 Warmingia buchtienii (Schltr.) Schltr. ex Garay & Christenson (1996) - Bolivia
 Warmingia eugenii Rchb.f. (1881)  - Brazil, Argentina, Paraguay
 Warmingia holopetala  Kraenzl. (1920) - Minas Gerais
 Warmingia zamorana  Dodson (1989) - Ecuador, Costa Rica

References

External links

Oncidiinae genera
Oncidiinae